Frank Francis Osmond (31 January 1920  – January 1973) was a Welsh rugby union, and professional rugby league footballer who played in the 1930s, 1940s and 1950s.

Background
Frank Osmond  was born in Newport, Monmouthshire, Wales.

International honours
Frank Osmond represented Great Britain (RL) while at Swinton in non-Test matches on the 1950 Great Britain Lions tour of Australasia, and won 14 caps for Wales (RL) in 1948–1951 while at Swinton.

References

External links
(archived by web.archive.org) Profile at blackandambers.co.uk
History of Newport > The 1946–47 Season
Search for "Frank Osmond" at britishnewspaperarchive.co.uk

1920 births
1973 deaths
Footballers who switched code
Great Britain national rugby league team players
Newport RFC players
Rugby league hookers
Rugby league players from Newport, Wales
Rugby union hookers
Rugby union players from Newport, Wales
Swinton Lions players
Wales national rugby league team players
Welsh rugby league players
Welsh rugby union players